Bennie Goods (born February 28, 1968) is a US-born former Canadian Football League defensive tackle. 

Goods was born in Pattison, Mississippi, and played eleven seasons for two different teams. Goods also played in the Arena Football League for the Detroit Fury.

References

External links
Bio

1968 births
Living people
People from Claiborne County, Mississippi
Players of American football from Mississippi
Alcorn State Braves football players
American players of Canadian football
Canadian football defensive linemen
Edmonton Elks players
Winnipeg Blue Bombers players
Detroit Fury players